Austregilde (548  580), also called Austrechild, Austerchild, Austregildis, Bobilla, and Bobile, was a Frankish queen consort of the 6th century.

She was not born into high social status, and was possibly a servant of Queen Marcatrude, the second wife of Guntram, King of Orléans, a servant of one of Guntram's courtiers, or even a slave in the household of Marcatrude's father. After Guntram's repudiation of his earlier queen in 565, she became his third wife. Objections to this marriage and to the legitimacy of Austregilde's children led to the deaths of Marcatrude's brothers and the banishment to a monastery of the Bishop of Gap, both on the orders of Guntram.

Austregilde and Guntram had two sons, Clotaire and Clodomir, and two daughters, Clodoberge and Clotilde. Austregilde outlived her sons, who died in 576 of illness. The fates of her daughters are unknown.

She died in 580, possibly of smallpox. According to Gregory of Tours, she angrily blamed her doctors Nicolas and Donat, claiming their medicines were responsible for her death. She asked Guntram to kill her doctors after her death, which he did. Gregory compares her actions to those of King Herod. Modern historians have suggested skepticism about Gregory's account of Austregilde's death. E. T. Dailey notes that it "is difficult to square this passage" with Gregory's "supposedly heroic" overall portrayal of Guntram and that "marriage to lowborn women was never likely to impress Gregory". Mark A. Handley contrasts Gregory's depiction of Austregilde with that of her "glowing" epitaph, which describes her as "mother of kings, a surpassing royal wife, the light of her homeland, the world, and the court" and praises her charitable nature. Handley is critical of those that have "unnecessarily followed" Gregory's lead, saying that the "opportunity to compare and contrast... has been universally missed."

Notes

References

Merovingian dynasty
Frankish queens consort
548 births
580 deaths
6th-century Frankish women
6th-century Frankish nobility